Roger Ashton (executed at Tyburn, 23 June 1592) was an English Roman Catholic soldier. He is a Catholic martyr.

Life
He was the third son of Richard Ashton of Croston, in Lancashire. In 1585 he had gone to serve in the Low Countries under the Earl of Leicester against the Spanish. Sir William Stanley having been placed on guard over the town of Deventer, which had revolted from the Spaniards, he, with the assistance of Ashton, gave the town back to Spain and went over to their side (29 January 1587).

Cardinal William Allen published a "Defence" of this act in the form of a letter addressed to one "R.A.". Stanley next entrusted to Ashton the task of bringing over his wife from Ireland, but she was already under arrest.

At the close of the year 1587 he returned to England and was apprehended in Kent with a marriage dispensation; Richard Challoner says it was a papal dispensation to marry his second cousin. In January, 1588, he was in the Tower of London. Ill towards the close of the year, he was transferred to easier confinement in the Marshalsea. From this he managed to escape and fled to his brothers in Lancashire. He was arrested later, at Shields (modern North Shields or South Shields, the historian does not specify which) near Newcastle, while trying to escape overseas.

Transferred to Durham and York, he was tried and sentenced at Canterbury. He was hanged, drawn, and quartered; his indictment is not preserved. He died a "very resolute" Catholic, making profession of his faith.

References

Attribution

1592 deaths
People executed under Elizabeth I by hanging, drawing and quartering
16th-century Roman Catholic martyrs
Year of birth unknown
16th-century English soldiers
English Roman Catholics
Executed people from Lancashire
Venerable martyrs of England and Wales